Ali Khalid (Arabic:علي خالد) (born 4 December 1997) is an Emirati footballer. He currently plays for Al Jazirah Al-Hamra as a midfielder.

Career
Ali Khalid started his career at Al Ahli and is a product of the Al-Ahli's youth system. and after hem played for Ajman, Hatta . Al Hamriyah, Al-Taawon, Ras Al Khaimah and Al Jazirah Al-Hamra.

External links

References

1997 births
Living people
Emirati footballers
Emirati people of Baloch descent
Al Ahli Club (Dubai) players
Ajman Club players
Hatta Club players
Al Hamriyah Club players
Al-Taawon (UAE) Club players
Ras Al Khaimah Club players
Al Jazirah Al Hamra Club players
UAE Pro League players
UAE First Division League players
Association football midfielders
Place of birth missing (living people)